The Commonwealth of Independent States Cup is a defunct annual regional association football tournament, recognized by FIFA.

The tournament was initially established for football clubs of the former Soviet Union republics in 1993 (a year later since the collapse). On several occasions, some national football organizations of the former Soviet republics as well as individual clubs refused participation in the tournament for different reasons. Usually the invitation was sent to the best clubs of the Commonwealth of Independent States member states, as well as Estonia, Latvia, Lithuania, i.e. either a champion or a runner-up, while in the later editions the Cup (before 2012) saw participation of clubs from Serbia and Finland.

In 2012, the CIS Cup became a competition of national youth teams. Previously only the Russia under-21 team competed in the competition.

The competition was disestablished in 2016.

History

The Commonwealth of Independent States Cup was planned to be the Champions' Cup of countries of CIS Commonwealth and Baltics. In July 1992 at a meeting of executive committee of the CIS Association of Football Federations adopted decision on launching the First Commonwealth of Independent States Cup since 1993 as an open tournament to champions from the USSR successor states (The Commonwealth of Independent States, and well as Estonia, Latvia and Lithuania).

Until 1996 Ukraine officially boycotted the competition, but in 1995 FC Shakhtar Donetsk on own initiative broke the boycott.

In 1995–2006 the Russia national under-21 football team participated in the tournament as the 16th team, but in 2007 and 2008 Serbia replaced it as the 17th nation sending a team to play in it, and became the first non-former Soviet Union nation participating in the tournament. Unlike the rest of the states, who send their latest champions to play in the tournament, Serbia has sent OFK Beograd to play in the tournament.

In its first years the tournament was popular in the territories of the former Soviet Union, including the most titled teams from the old Soviet Top League. Spartak Moscow from Russia, and Dynamo Kyiv from Ukraine each won the cup several times but, after less than a decade, the teams from Russia and Ukraine became hesitant to send their best players to play on the artificial turf at the Olympic Stadium, so they sent their reserve players instead or sometimes the league runners-up participated in their place. This resulted in the decrease of the tournament's popularity in those states particularly and in the international value of the tournament overall.

In 2006 a new tournament, Channel One Cup, started and caught the attention of the Russian and Ukrainian teams, which even more decreased the popularity of the Commonwealth of Independent States Cup tournament.

A big scandal occurred in 2006, when the Armenian champion FC Pyunik refused to play the Azerbaijani team, Neftçi PFK due to the lack of diplomatic relations between the two countries' governments at that time due to the Nagorno-Karabakh conflict. FC Pyunik defeated Ukrainian team FC Shakhtar Donetsk 3–1 in the quarter-final, earning a place in the semi-final against Neftçi. However, FC Pyunik announced that they would no play against an Azerbaijani team, and flew home from Moscow the same evening. The Russian Football Union gave FC Shakhtar Donetsk a technical victory 3–0 so they could play in the semi-final instead of FC Pyunik, but FC Shakhtar Donetsk declined the offer stating that "...we would really want to play in the semi-final, but we don't want to get there by any other way than sport". Eventually, Neftçi PFK were given a bye to the final, where they defeated the Lithuanian club FBK Kaunas 4–2.

In 2007 talks began about changing the format of the cup, and uniting it with the Channel One Cup in order to bring back the interest of the Russian and Ukrainian teams, and in 2007 its games were even visited by representatives from FIFA, but nevertheless, nothing came out from those talks and efforts.

In October 2009, Bunyodkor coach Luis Felipe Scolari announced that his Uzbek side would not enter the 2010 tournament due to focusing on the Asian Champions League.

Finals

Competitions for U-21 national teams

Club competitions

All-time top scorers

Top scorers by year

Performances by team

Performances by country the clubs came from

Records
 The biggest victory ever in the tournament took place in the 1998, when Spartak Moscow (Russia) beat Vakhsh Qurghonteppa (Tajikistan) 19–0.
 The player holding a record of appearances in the tournament is Mihails Zemļinskis from FC Skonto Riga who appeared 46 times in the tournament.
 The record for most titles won by a player is four and it is held by Oleksandr Holovko from Dynamo Kyiv and Dmitri Khlestov from Spartak Moscow.
 The biggest number for a team to win the cup in a row is three, and the teams who have done it where Spartak Moscow (Russia, twice. in 1993, 1994, 1995, and in 1999, 2000, 2001) and Dynamo Kyiv (Ukraine. 1996, 1997, 1998).

See also
United Tournament
Channel One Cup
Football at the Spartakiads of Peoples of the USSR

References

External links

Official Website
Official Statistics and Information About The Tournament From The Rec Sport Soccer Statistics Foundation
A fan site. Contains information only since 1999

 
Sport in the Commonwealth of Independent States
International association football competitions hosted by Russia
Russian football friendly trophies
Recurring sporting events established in 1993
Recurring sporting events disestablished in 2016
1993 establishments in Russia
2016 disestablishments in Russia